Panchavalli is a village near Hunsur in Mysore district of Karnataka state in India.

Location
Panchavalli is located on Mysore – Virajpet road after Hunsur town and before Thithimathi town.

Post Office
There is a post office at Panchavalli.  The postal code is 571105.

Demographics
Panchavalli village has a population of 2,009 people.  There are a total of 445 houses. The literacy rate is 65%. Female literacy is only 57%.

Administration
The village has a council called Panchayath headed by a Sarpanch.

References

Villages in Mysore district